Holy Haunted House is a live recording released by American rock band Gov't Mule in June 2008. It includes the entire 2007 Halloween performance (October 31, 2007 at The O'Shaughnessy Theatre in Saint Paul, Minnesota) including their cover of Led Zeppelin's album Houses of the Holy.

Track listing

Disc one

 "Play with Fire"
 "Time to Confess"
 "Million Miles from Yesterday"
 "Rocking Horse"
 "Birth of the Mule"
 "Larger than Life"
 "Fallen Down"
 "The Other One Jam"
 "Blind Man in the Dark"

Disc two

 "The Song Remains the Same"
 "The Rain Song"
 "Over the Hills and Far Away"
 "The Crunge"
 "Dancing Days"
 "Drums"
 "D'yer Mak'er"
 "No Quarter"
 "The Ocean"
 "Come On into My Kitchen"
 "32/20 Blues"

Gov't Mule albums
2008 live albums
Led Zeppelin tribute albums